Marble Blast Ultra is a 3D puzzle action game involving a marble developed by GarageGames.  It was released on January 25, 2006 for the Xbox 360 via Xbox Live Arcade. It is the sequel to Marble Blast Gold. It features 60 levels, enhanced graphics, 2 new power-ups and a multiplayer mode. A PC port of the game under the title Marble Blast Online was available at InstantAction until the website was shut down. As of year-end 2010, Marble Blast Ultra has sold over 756,000 copies.

Gameplay

In Single player mode, the player has the main goal of reaching the finish pad of the level as fast as possible. Obstacles will hinder the player's progress, but powerups are also provided to help the player finish the level. There are sixty single player levels that can be completed by the player. They are divided into Beginner, Intermediate, and Advanced Levels, each category containing twenty levels. Many of these levels (such as 'Survival of the Fittest', 'Natural Selection', and 'Ordeal') are recycled from Marble Blast Gold.

There is a par time set for each of the levels, and if the player beats the level under par time, the player will earn achievements based on how many levels they successfully completed under par time. Additionally, if the player has Xbox Live connection, their best time will show on a leaderboard where players worldwide can compare their best times. The leaderboard is updated whenever a player gets a new record time.

The game makes use of two new power-ups:
Ultra blast - instantly increases the blast meter, and adds more power. The player can even perform a double jump.
Mega marble - makes the marble bigger, allowing it to knock other marbles off-course. The power-up lasts at least 10 seconds before the marble shrinks back to normal.

Another added feature is the introduction of Easter Eggs, which are found in hidden locations in 20 of the game's 60 levels.  After finding one Easter Egg, the game will award the achievement "Egg Seeker".  After finding all 20 Easter Eggs, the game will award the "Egg Basket" achievement.

Multiplayer
Multiplayer mode contains 20 levels and supports up to 8 simultaneous players. There is only one mode which consists of collecting gems within a certain time limit (three to six minutes), which depends on the level. After a group of 2-6 gems are collected entirely, another set of gems appear elsewhere on the board. Players race to these gems and use power-ups to navigate across the level quicker and interfere with other players.

There are three types of gems: red, yellow, and blue. Red gems are worth one point, while yellows are worth two and blues are worth five. Most likely, blue and yellow gems are much harder to get than the red ones. The player at the end of the time limit with the most points wins. Players can change their marble's appearance by choosing from a variety of patterns and pictures in the main menu, such as a globe marble or a tiger marble as well as adding several different effects to use online. Ranked matches and player matches are supported along with an overall multiplayer leaderboard for ranked and player matches. Users can create a game or join one and filter parameters such as level, players, and gamer zone. Private games are also supported.

Development and marketing
On December 5, 2007, Marble Blast Ultra was made an Xbox Live Arcade Hit and had its price lowered. In 2008, three new achievements totaling 50 gamerscore were added to Marble Blast Ultra on Xbox.com. On Wednesday the 29th of October 2008 a new downloadable content pack was made available which contained a new multiplayer level "Marble It Up". On December 3, 2008 the Marble-Fu map pack was released, and on December 23, 2008 the Agoraphobia pack was released. Each pack contained five maps and was available on InstantAction prior to their Xbox 360 release.

On February 12, 2011 Marble Blast Ultra was delisted from the Xbox Live Arcade service. Despite this, a Microsoft Windows version was released later that year. GarageGames, now a subsidiary of Graham Software Development, retained the rights to the Torque Engine which powers Marble Blast Ultra, but not the rights to the game. Game rights are property of InstantAction Holdings. GarageGames CEO Eric Preisz said that it was "unlikely" that the studio would reacquire the rights to its games.
The members of the development team later worked on a spiritual successor, Marble It Up!, which released for the Nintendo Switch in September 2018 and subsequently for Windows and Apple Arcade.

See also

 Marble Madness
 Switchball
 Super Monkey Ball (series)
Neverball

References

External links
 Official Web site for the September 2019 freeware Windows port
 Marble Blast Ultra on the Xbox Live Marketplace (Archive link)

2006 video games
Puzzle video games
Windows games
Xbox 360 Live Arcade games
Xbox 360 games
Marble games
Video games developed in the United States